Istominskaya is a rural locality (a village) in Ustretskoye Rural Settlement, Syamzhensky District, Vologda Oblast, Russia. The population was 141 as of 2002. There are 4 streets.

Geography 
Istominskaya is located 27 km northwest of Syamzha (the district's administrative centre) by road. Rechkovskaya is the nearest rural locality.

References 

Rural localities in Syamzhensky District